Huey Tecuilhuitl also called Uey Tecuilhuitl  is the name of the eighth month of the Aztec calendar. It is also a festival  in the Aztec religion dedicated to Xilonen and Cihuacoatl. It is called the Great festival of the Lords.

References

Aztec calendars
Aztec mythology and religion